The Mahindra Marksman is India’s first armoured capsule-based light bulletproof vehicle to provide protection to the personnel of defence, paramilitary and police forces against small arms fire and grenade attacks. It has capability to be used in counter terrorist as well as conventional roles.

History
The Mahindra Marksman was first unveiled in 2009 and was first put into service by Mumbai Police's Force One and was then ordered by several other state and central police forces and by paramilitary forces including CRPF, BSF and CISF.

Design

Sides – Can withstand three direct hits of 7.62×51mm NATO Ball M80, 7.62×39mm Ball PS and 5.56×45mm Ball M 193 at a distance of 10m at 90° angle attack.
Top – Can withstand three direct hits of above ammunition at a distance of 10m at 45° angle attack.
Floor – Protection against two DM 51(German norm) hand grenades detonated under the vehicle simultaneously.
Additional protection – All joints and welding have overlap. The rear stowage boxes provide protection to crew when using the rear door.
Cuppola has a machine gun mount with 270° traverse and protection.
Seven crew firing ports.
Outward facing configured rear seat and wide bulletproof windows allows total operational orientation of the crew sitting at the rear.
Search light mounted on top of the vehicle controlled from inside the vehicle by the driver/co driver.
Rear view camera and a TV screen for the driver and co driver to see the dead zone behind the vehicle.

Users
 : Used by the Carabineros de Chile.
 : Used by Force One of Mumbai Police, Delhi Police, CISF, Jammu and Kashmir Police, CRPF and Kolkata Police.

References

External links
 Mahindra Marksman

Armoured cars
Armoured personnel carriers of India
All-wheel-drive vehicles
Military vehicles introduced in the 2000s
Mahindra vehicles